Brezje pri Vinjem Vrhu is a settlement in the hills south of Semič in southeastern Slovenia. The area is part of the historical region of Lower Carniola. The Municipality of Semič is now included in the Southeast Slovenia Statistical Region.

Name
Brezje pri Vinjem Vrhu was attested in written sources as Bresia in 1490.  The name Brezje literally means 'birch woods', derived from the common noun breza 'birch'. Like similar toponyms in Slovenia (e.g., Brezova, Brezovec, Brezovci), it originally referred to the local vegetation.

Cultural heritage
A Bronze Age settlement was identified in the area in a 1986 archaeological field survey.

References

External links
Brezje pri Vinjem Vrhu at Geopedia

Populated places in the Municipality of Semič